Yeshiva College is located in New York City’s Washington Heights neighborhood in Upper Manhattan. It is Yeshiva University’s undergraduate college of liberal arts and sciences for men. (Stern College for Women is Yeshiva College’s counterpart for women.) The architecture reflects a search for a distinctly Jewish style appropriate to American academia.

Roughly 1,100 students from some two dozen countries, including students registered at Syms School of Business, attend Yeshiva College.

On July 27, 2009, it was announced that Barry L. Eichler, Ph.D., would succeed David J. Srolovitz, Ph.D. as dean of Yeshiva College.

Philosophy 
Students at Yeshiva College pursue a dual educational program that combines liberal arts and sciences and pre-professional studies with the study of Torah and Jewish heritage, reflecting Yeshiva’s educational philosophy of Torah Umadda, which translates loosely as “Torah and secular knowledge” (the interaction between Judaism and general culture).

Academics 
Majors offered include:
Biochemistry 
 Biology 
 Chemistry
 Classical languages
 Computer sciences
 Economics
 English
 Finance
 General Business
 Hebrew
 History
 Jewish studies
 Management
 Mathematics
 Music
 Philosophy
 Physics
 Political science
 Pre-engineering
 Psychology
 Sociology
 Speech and drama

Combined and joint programs in business administration, dentistry, engineering, Jewish education, Jewish studies, law, occupational therapy, optometry, podiatric medicine, and social work are also available.

Minors offered include:
 American studies
 Architecture
 Art
 Biology
 Business
 Chemistry
 Classical languages
 Computer sciences
 Economics
 English (Literature and Writing tracks)
 Hebrew
 History
 Jewish studies
 Mathematics
 Music
 Philosophy
 Physics
 Political science
 Psychology
 Public health
 Sociology
 Spanish
 Speech and drama

The Robert M. Beren Department of Jewish Studies unifies and centralizes all academic Jewish studies offerings at Yeshiva College: Bible, Hebrew, Jewish history, Jewish philosophy, and Judaic studies.

In addition to courses leading to the B.A. degree, all students undertake Jewish studies requiring intensive analysis of classic texts in Hebrew and Aramaic. Students are enrolled in a full course of study in one of the following options:

 James Striar School of General Jewish Studies/the Mechinah Program
 Yeshiva Program/Mazer School of Talmudic Studies
 Isaac Breuer College of Hebraic Studies
 Irving I. Stone Beit Midrash Program

Yeshiva College's Jay and Jeanie Schottenstein Honors program stresses writing, critical analysis, cultural enrichment, and individual mentoring.

The S. Daniel Abraham Israel Program allows students who wish to spend a year in Israel to take courses at one of 51 different Israeli institutions.

Student life 
Athletics include Maccabees basketball, tennis, fencing, cross-country, golf, soccer, volleyball, wrestling, and baseball. Other student activities include the newspaper The Commentator and the radio station WYUR.

Student government
The student government includes the Yeshiva College Student Association (YCSA), the Yeshiva Student Union (YSU), the Student Organization of Yeshiva and Judaic Studies Programs (SOY/JSC), and the Syms School Of Business Student Association.

Dormitories and student housing
Approximately 90% of the undergraduate student population(s) lives on campus.

The Wilf Campus includes three main dormitory buildings: Morgenstern, Muss, and Rubin Residence Halls. Many upperclassmen live in the surrounding independent housing that is run by the university or in other nearby buildings.

Notable alumni
 Rabbi Chaim Brovender
 Erica Brown
 Shaye Cohen
 Hillel Furstenberg
 Ari Goldman
 Louis Henkin
 Daniel Kurtzer, former United States Ambassador to Israel and Egypt
 Matthew Levitt
 Nathan Lewin
 Rabbi Albert L. Lewis
 Josef Mandelbaum, CEO of American Greetings
 Chaim Potok
 Rabbi Shlomo Riskin
 Henry Siegman
 Shlomo Sternberg
 Alan E. Willner
Aaron Klein, author and chief strategist for Prime Minister Benjamin Netanyahu

Notable faculty
Joseph B. Soloveitchik
Adam Zachary Newton

Facilities 
The campus is centered on the area of Amsterdam Ave and West 185th Street (Yeshiva University's main office is 500 185th St). The buildings in the campus are:

 David H. Zysman Hall
 Sol and Hilda Furst Hall
 Belfer Hall
 Schottenstein Center
 Mendel Gottesman Library
 Max Stern Athletic Building and Benjamin Gottesman Pool
 Ruth and Hyman Muss, Morris and Celia Morgenstern, Joseph and Dora Strenger, and Leah and Joseph Rubin Residence Halls
 Glueck Center for Jewish Studies

See also
 List of Jewish universities and colleges in the United States
Yeshiva College (disambiguation)

References

Further reading 
Menachem Butler and Zev Nagel, eds., My Yeshiva College: 75 Years of Memories (New York: Yashar Books, 2006) .
Victor Geller, Orthodoxy Awakens: The Belkin Era and Yeshiva University (Jerusalem; Urim Publications, 2003)  
Jeffrey S. Gurock, Men and Women of Yeshiva University: Higher Education, Orthodoxy and American Judaism (New York; Columbia University Press, 1988) 
Aaron Rakeffet-Rothkoff, Bernard Revel: Builder of American Jewish Orthodoxy (Philadelphia; Jewish Publication Society, 1972) 
Gilbert Klaperman, The Story of Yeshiva University, the First Jewish University in America (Macmillan, 1969)

External links

Emporis Standards Committee. "Official World's 50 Tallest High-rise Buildings (Educational Use)"

Men's universities and colleges in the United States
Universities and colleges in New York City
Yeshiva University
Washington Heights, Manhattan
Jewish universities and colleges
Jewish universities and colleges in the United States
Universities and colleges in Manhattan